Cam Lyman, born Camilla Lowell Lyman in Westwood, Massachusetts, was a multimillionaire breeder of champion Clumber spaniels and Bernese mountain dogs who notably died under mysterious circumstances. Lyman's father was Arthur T. Lyman, a prominent Bostonian and scion of the wealthy Lyman family who made their money in the China trade and later in cotton mills and the cotton trade.

Lyman was a trans man. The Independent reported that, as a middle-aged adult, Lyman was "known to acquaintances as a man" and cultivated "a male identity". Lyman disappeared in 1987 and was declared dead in 1995.

Biography

Lyman bred and trained Clumber spaniels and Bernese mountain dogs, and was well known for being talented but rather reclusive. Beginning around 1978, when he moved from the family estate "Ricefields" on Thacher Street in Westwood, Massachusetts, to a home in Rhode Island, Lyman began to wear men's clothing, cut his hair short, and reportedly took steroids and grew a mustache. By 1985, he had the typical appearance of a male and went by the name Cam. It was during this time that Lyman began to associate with a man named George O'Neil. O'Neil became caretaker of Lyman's estate, and fed, showed, and took care of his dogs.

In 1987, Lyman's relatives failed to receive the customary Christmas card from him. They investigated his disappearance and discovered that no one had seen or heard from Lyman in months. Police questioned O'Neil, who claimed that in the summer of 1987, he and Lyman had a fight over the phone about the dogs, and Lyman hung up on him. The next day, O'Neil went over to Lyman's house and found the phone ripped out of the wall and the doors wide open. O'Neil claimed that he believed Lyman had gone to Europe to undergo sexual reassignment surgery. However, O'Neil failed to provide police any proof that Lyman had gone to Europe. O'Neil also failed to explain why he had not informed anyone of Lyman's disappearance for nearly six months.

In December 1997, Lyman's body was found in a septic tank on his estate in Hopkinton, Rhode Island, by owners who had recently purchased the house. His final will named the American Kennel Club's Museum of the Dog as the sole beneficiary. The story was featured on Unsolved Mysteries, but as of 2011 no one has ever been charged in the case.

In 2003, George O'Neil was indicted for embezzling $15,000 from Cam Lyman's estate. He was sentenced to one year of probation and ordered to pay $450 in court costs. He died in 2011 without giving any more information on Cam Lyman's death.

See also
List of solved missing person cases
List of transgender people
List of transgender-related topics
List of unsolved deaths

Notes

Further reading
 Hélèna Katz, Cold Cases: Famous Unsolved Mysteries, Crimes, and Disappearances in America, pp. 333–338, ABC-CLIO, 2010

1932 births
1980s missing person cases
20th-century deaths
20th-century American LGBT people
Dog breeders
Formerly missing people
LGBT people from Massachusetts
Missing person cases in Rhode Island
People declared dead in absentia
People from Westwood, Massachusetts
Transgender men
Unsolved murders in the United States
Year of death unknown